"Angel" is a song by English singer Tina Cousins. It was released on 25 August 1997 as her second single, then was later re-released on 27 September 1999 as the fourth single from her first album, Killing Time (1999). "Angel" did not chart during its original release but reached number 46 on the UK Singles Chart in October 1999.

Music video
The music video for "Angel" features Cousins in various different settings

Track listings
 "Angel" (radio edit) – 3:49
 "Angel" (Fishead radio edit) – 4:12
 "Angel" (Mount Rushmore Full Fat Mix) – 8:16
 "Angel" (Tall Paul Remix) – 7:00
 "Angel" (Science Fiction Mix) – 8:00
 "Angel" (Fishead Hells Angel Dub) – 4:46

Charts

References

Tina Cousins songs
1997 singles
1997 songs
1999 singles
Jive Records singles
Songs written by Karl Twigg
Songs written by Mark Topham